The Vineland Historical and Antiquarian Society is the oldest local historical society in New Jersey. Its primary mission is to collect and preserve artifacts and records related to Vineland, New Jersey, the South Jersey region, and American history, and share that material with the public through exhibits, programs and other appropriate venues.

History
Founded in 1864, three years after the creation of the town of Vineland, the society has been dedicated to preserving both local and regional history. The society's museum is the oldest purpose-built museum in the state. It opened to the public in 1910 at the corner of Seventh and Elmer Streets, just one block south of downtown Vineland. The museum features permanent exhibits of antique furnishings, paintings, military artifacts, broadsides, and musical instruments. There are rooms dedicated to the Civil War, the history of local Native American cultures, and glass making. The Charles K. Landis room features many furnishings and personal items that once belonged to the town founder. The Society also maintains an archives at the museum, which includes photographs, local newspapers and South Jersey census records, as well as a library of general history and biographical works. 

The Vineland Historical and Antiquarian Society celebrated its 150th Anniversary in 2014.

Collections
 The Civil War Room
 The Glass Room
 Native American Collection
 Charles K. Landis Room, Founder of Vineland, N.J.
 The Great Hall, exhibits
 Art, Portraits, Glass, artifacts

Persons of note
 Charles K. Landis
 Frank D. Andrews
 Victor Durand Jr.
Mary Treat
 Mary Tillotson
 Thomas Bramwell Welch, Creator of Welch's Grape Juice
 Walter Lewis Shaw, telecommunications inventor

External links
 Vineland Historical and Antiquarian Society

Vineland, New Jersey
Historical societies in New Jersey